Sir John Bennet (1553 – 15 February 1627) was a judge and politician who sat in the House of Commons between 1597 and 1621. His career ended in controversy after he was found guilty of extorting bribes and excessive fees.

Education
Bennet was the second son of Richard Bennet of Clapcot, Berkshire (now in Oxfordshire) and his wife, Elizabeth Tesdale, the daughter of Thomas Tesdale of Stanford Dingley and Abingdon. She was the half-sister of Thomas Tesdale, the founder of Pembroke College, Oxford. He was probably educated at John Roysse's Free School in Abingdon (now Abingdon School). of which his family were benefactors. He matriculated at Christ Church, Oxford in 1573. He was awarded BA on 11 June 1577 and was promoted to MA on 15 June 1580. In 1583 he was incorporated at Cambridge and awarded MA there. He returned to Oxford and was elected a proctor in 1585.  He was awarded his BCL and DCL by special dispensation on 6 July 1589. In the following year was admitted as an advocate in the Court of Arches.

Career
Bennet began his career as vicar-general and chancellor in the Diocese of York, probably through the influence of John Piers, the Archbishop of York, who had been the Dean of Christ Church. He was joint commissary of the exchequer court.  In 1591 he was appointed to the prebend of Langtoft. In 1594 he was appointed J.P. for the East Riding of Yorkshire. He advanced his career in other areas, serving as a legal adviser to a commission negotiating with Scotland about the security of the border, and in 1599 was appointed to the Council of the North.

In 1597, Bennet was elected Member of Parliament for Ripon. He was elected MP for York in 1601. He was knighted at Whitehall on 23 July 1603. In 1603 or 1604 he became judge of the Prerogative Court of Canterbury, retaining his positions in York as commissary until 1609 and chancellor until 1624. He was elected MP for Ripon again in 1604. During his time in Parliament, he defended the ecclesiastical courts but was unsuccessful in preventing a bill prohibiting married men residing with their families in the colleges of Oxford and Cambridge Universities.  He was a member of the High Court of Delegates, hearing appeals from ecclesiastical and admiralty courts, and the Court of High Commission. In 1608 he was appointed Master in Chancery in Ordinary and in 1611 was appointed to the council of Queen Anne, wife of James I. He was growing in wealth and status and is reported to have offered £30,000 to become Lord Chancellor, without success.

Bennet, who was interested in the affairs of Oxford University, was asked by Sir Thomas Bodley to act as fund-raiser for the Bodleian Library, a task he carried out efficiently.  Bennet was one of the first governors of Pembroke College, Oxford. He was elected MP for Oxford University in 1614 and 1621.  However, he was accused by Richard Kilvert in Parliament of extracting bribes and excessive fees in his judicial work. The issue was debated in his absence, Bennet pleading ill-health, and it was decided that he should be expelled from the House of Commons and the case referred to the House of Lords. He was placed under house arrest.  When he appeared before the House of Lords, he said that he could account for all but £4,000 of the money that had passed through his hands.  He was bailed in the sum of £20,000 and ordered to pay to Oxford University £1,000 that he still had as executor of Thomas Bodley's estate: he only paid £550.  When the case was eventually tried, Bennet's counsel put up a weak defence. Bennet was fined £20,000, but punishments of imprisonment and disqualification from office were later lifted. It was said that his profiteering from his post overshadowed that of Francis Bacon: "Sir John Bennet hath made my Lord Chancellor an honest man".

Personal life
Bennet married firstly Alice Weekes daughter of Christopher Weekes of Salisbury, and had four sons and two daughters. She died in 1601 and he married secondly Elizabeth Lowe, daughter of Sir Thomas Lowe, alderman of London. She died in 1614 and he married thirdly Leonora daughter of Adrian Vierandeels of Antwerp, a widow.

Bennet died on 15 February 1627 and was buried at Christ Church, Newgate, City of London.

See also
 List of Old Abingdonians

References

Sources

1553 births
1627 deaths
17th-century English judges
Members of the pre-1707 Parliament of England for the University of Oxford
Alumni of Christ Church, Oxford
People from Abingdon-on-Thames
English MPs 1601
English MPs 1604–1611
English MPs 1597–1598
English MPs 1614
English MPs 1621–1622
People educated at Abingdon School
16th-century English judges
Knights Bachelor